John Jay Barber ( – ) was an American painter.

He studied law, was admitted to the bar in 1862, joined the volunteer army during the American Civil War in 1863, returned sick, and upon recovery determined to devote himself to painting. He received no instruction in art, but settled in Columbus, Ohio, in 1871, and opened a studio. He devoted himself at first to landscapes, delineating scenes in the Muskingum valley. Subsequently he executed cattle pieces, and after 1881 exhibited in the National Academy in New York. In 1881 he painted the "Elysium of the Herd"; in 1882, "Pride of Eastwood Jerseys," and "A Thirsty Party"; in 1883, "The Thirsty Herd," and "Jersey Herd"; in 1884, " The Passing Shower," and "In Pastures Green"; in 1885, "The Cool Retreat."

In 1910, Barber was interred in the Columbus State Hospital due to mental illness attributed to injuries from a fall in the previous April.  He committed suicide there with a razor and died on November 27, 1910.

References

External links
 

Created via preloaddraft
1840 births
1910 deaths
People from Sandusky, Ohio
19th-century American painters
20th-century American painters